Trunk 12 is part of the Canadian province of Nova Scotia's system of Trunk Highways.

Route description

The road's routing is through mostly uninhabited forest land, with a few small villages such as New Ross located on the route. For about 5 km, the road follows the eastern shore of Gaspereau Lake, the largest lake in Kings County, Nova Scotia.

Communities

Chester Basin
Chester Grant
Seffernsville
New Ross
Aldersville
Blue Mountain
South Alton
Kentville

Major intersections

External links
 Webcam on Trunk 12 near Blue Mountain

References

Nova Scotia provincial highways
Roads in Kings County, Nova Scotia
Roads in Lunenburg County, Nova Scotia